Robbie Burton (born 26 December 1999) is a professional footballer who plays as a midfielder.

Born in England, he represents Wales at youth international level.

Early and personal life
Burton was born in Gravesend. He grew up near Welling, and was raised by his grandparents.

Club career
Burton began his career with Teviot Rangers, signing for Arsenal at the age of 6. He turned professional in summer 2018. He became captain of the Arsenal under-23 team for the 2019–20 season.

In February 2020 he moved to Croatian club Dinamo Zagreb, playing initially for their second team in the Druga HNL.

The transfer was reportedly worth up to £800,000. He made two appearances for Dinamo Zagreb II in Druga HNL, against Hrvatski Dragovoljac and Sesvete on 28 February and 8 March respectively, getting sent off during the latter match. Following a good performance in a 3–0 friendly win over Celje on 8 August, coach Zoran Mamić decided to give Burton a chance in the first team. He made his Prva HNL debut on 16 August 2020 in a 6–0 win over Lokomotiva. On 5 November 2020, he made his European debut for Dinamo in the 1–0 Europa League victory over Wolfsberg.

On 21 August 2021, Burton was loaned out to Istra 1961 until the end of the season.

In July 2022, he signed for League of Ireland Premier Division club Sligo Rovers on loan until the end of their season. He made his debut on 31 July 2022, coming off the bench in a 2–1 FAI Cup defeat at home to Wexford.

In January 2023, Burton parted ways with Dinamo Zagreb.

International career
Burton was eligible for Wales through his Welsh grandfather, and played for them at under-16, under-17 and under-19 youth level, before progressing to under-21.

Career statistics

References

External links

1999 births
Living people
Welsh people of English descent
English people of Welsh descent
English footballers
Welsh footballers
Association football midfielders
Wales youth international footballers
Arsenal F.C. players
GNK Dinamo Zagreb players
GNK Dinamo Zagreb II players
NK Istra 1961 players
First Football League (Croatia) players
Croatian Football League players
Welsh expatriate footballers
Welsh expatriate sportspeople in Croatia
Expatriate footballers in Croatia
English expatriate sportspeople in Croatia
Sligo Rovers F.C. players
League of Ireland players
Expatriate association footballers in the Republic of Ireland
Wales under-21 international footballers